Chu Omambala, sometimes credited as Chukwuma Omambala, Chukwuma Ombala, or Chu Ombala, is a British film, TV and theatre actor.

Early life and career 

Omambala studied economics and politics at the University of London. He wasn't interested in reading Shakespeare stories at school, or the theatre in general. He only became interested from watching film and TV, and later realising that his favourite film and TV actors had all started in theatre. He then joined the Royal Central School of Speech and Drama.

Filmography
Omambala has appeared in television roles including Major Blake in the Doctor Who story "The Christmas Invasion" as well as in the 2019 series Queens of Mystery.

Television

Films

Theatre

External links
 
 
 Creative Artists Management - Chukwuma Omambala
 Broadway World - Chukwuma Omambala
 Theatricalia - Chu Omambala

References

Year of birth missing (living people)
Living people
British male television actors
English people of Ghanaian descent